The Zouxian Power Station, also known as Zouxian Power Plant,  is one of the largest power stations in China, with an installed capacity of . The facility is located in Shandong Province, and is operated by China Huadian Corporation. It runs on coal.

See also 

 List of coal power stations
 List of largest power stations in the world
 List of power stations in China

References 

Coal-fired power stations in China
Power stations in Shandong